Motya is a genus of moths of the family Nolidae. The genus was erected by Francis Walker in 1859.

Species
Motya abseuzalis Walker, 1859 Florida, Antilles to Brazil
Motya arcuata (Schaus, 1910) Costa Rica
Motya flotsama (Dyar, 1914) Panama
Motya griselda (Dyar, 1914) Mexico, Panama, Venezuela
Motya mythias (Schaus, 1921) Guatemala
Motya siopera (Dyar, 1914) Panama, Mexico

References

Chloephorinae